The 2014–15 Southeast Missouri State Redhawks men's basketball team represented Southeast Missouri State University during the 2014–15 NCAA Division I men's basketball season. The Redhawks, led by sixth year head coach Dickey Nutt, played their home games at the Show Me Center and were members of the West Division of the Ohio Valley Conference. They finished the season 13–17, 7–9 in OVC play to finish in fifth place in the West Division. They lost in the first round of the OVC tournament to Morehead State.

On March 23, head coach Dicky Nutt was fired. He finished at SEMO with a six year record of 67–91.

Roster

Schedule

|-
!colspan=9 style="background:#FF0000; color:#000000;"| Exhibition

|-
!colspan=9 style="background:#FF0000; color:#000000;"| Regular season

|-
!colspan=9 style="background:#FF0000; color:#000000;"|Ohio Valley tournament

References

Southeast Missouri State Redhawks men's basketball seasons
Southeast Missouri State
Southeast Missouri State Redhawks men's basketball
Southeast Missouri State Redhawks men's basketball